Crossfire is a 2022 British television thriller series, created and written by Louise Doughty (her first original television series). It is about a British family who are caught up in an armed assault on a holiday resort in Spain. It was produced by Dancing Ledge Productions, in association with Buddy Club Productions, for the BBC, with the participation of RTVE. It stars Keeley Hawes, Josette Simon and Anneika Rose, and was broadcast on 20, 21 and 22 September 2022 on BBC One.

Plot
Jo takes her family on holiday to Hotel Barranco Tropical, a resort in the Canary Islands, as her marriage is falling apart. However, she and her family are soon thrust into a battle for survival when gunmen attack the hotel.

Cast

Guests
 Keeley Hawes as Jo Cross, a security consultant, former police officer and Jason's wife
 Lee Ingleby as Jason Cross, a social worker and Jo's husband 
 Daniel Ryan as Ben Cross, Jason's brother, a nurse and Miriam's husband 
 Josette Simon as Dr. Miriam Alderton, a GP and Ben's wife
 Vikash Bhai as Chinar Doshi, a businessman and Abhi's husband
 Anneika Rose as Abhilasa 'Abhi' Doshi, Chinar's wife 
 Noah Leggott as Adam Cross, Jo and Jason's son
 Shalisha James-Davis as Amara, Jo's daughter from her first marriage
 Zakiy Jogi as Gatik Doshi, Chinar and Abhi's eldest son
 Arjun Subramaniam as Jaypal Doshi, Chinar and Abhi's middle son
 Viaan Mayur as Sunil 'Suni' Doshi, Chinar and Abhi's youngest son

Hotel staff
 Hugo Silva as Mateo Rodrigues, the concierge and security manager 
 Alba Brunet as Bea Rodrigues, the manager and Mateo's wife
 Marta Fuenar as Pilar, a waitress and Bea's cousin
 Guillermo Campra as Iker, a waiter
 Christian Sánchez as Eusebio
 Gladys Balaguer as Marta, a member of kitchen staff

Other
 Pol Toro as Gerardo, the lead shooter and Flavio's older brother
 Pol Sanuy as Flavio, one of the shooters and Gerardo's younger brother
 Ariyon Bakare as Paul, a police officer, Jo's ex-husband and Amara's father

Episode list

Reception
The series received mixed to negative reviews. Lucy Mangan of The Guardian awarded the first episode two stars out of five, praising the opening but stating, 'If you are suffering from a tension pneumothorax yourself and can’t reach the remote control, or if you are a great devotee of the game Who’s Markised Next For Death?, it’s an OK watch. For the rest of us, there’s lots of other stuff to be getting on with, I’ll bet.' Anita Singh in The Telegraph also gave it two stars out of five, comparing it to a soap opera. Nick Hilton from The Independent gave the first episode two out of five stars, lambasting the writing but praising Hawes.

James Jackson of The Times gave it three stars.

References

External links 
 

2022 British television series debuts
2022 British television series endings
2020s British drama television series
2020s British television miniseries
British thriller television series
English-language television shows